Gail Alexandra Carpenter, Ph.D (born 1948) is a cognitive scientist, neuroscientist and mathematician. She is now a "Professor Emerita of Mathematics and Statistics, Boston University." She had also been a Professor of Cognitive and Neural Systems at Boston University, and the director of the Department of Cognitive and Neural Systems (CNS) Technology Lab at Boston University.

Early life
Gail Carpenter is the only daughter of Chadwick Hunter "Chad" Carpenter (1920-1996) and Ruth M. (née Stevenson) Carpenter (1920-2010). She has four brothers.

Carpenter attended the International School of Geneva (1961-1966) then went to the University of Colorado in Boulder earning a B.A. in 1970 (summa cum laude, mathematics). She then earned a Ph.D. in mathematics at the University of Wisconsin–Madison. Carpenter then taught at MIT and Northeastern University before moving to Boston University.

Carpenter married Stephen Grossberg on June 16, 1979, in Boston University Castle in Boston, Massachusetts.

Adaptive resonance theory
Carpenter's "neural modeling" efforts were clearly seen in her 1974 mathematics PhD thesis on Traveling wave solutions of nerve impulse equations at the University of Wisconsin Department of Mathematics while working with Charles C. Conley. Later she re-defined and expanded her theories in various papers during the mid to late 1970s. She defined the "generalized Hodgkin-Huxley models, used dynamical systems techniques to analyze their solutions, and characterized the qualitative properties of the burst suppression patterns that a typical neuron may propagate: while investigating normal and abnormal signal patterns in nerve cells.

Adaptive resonance theory (ART) is a theory developed by Stephen Grossberg and Gail Carpenter on aspects of how the brain processes information. It describes a number of neural network models which use supervised and unsupervised learning methods, and address problems such as pattern recognition and prediction.

The primary intuition behind the ART model is that object identification and recognition generally occur as a result of the interaction of 'top-down' observer expectations with 'bottom-up' sensory information. The model postulates that 'top-down' expectations take the form of a memory template or prototype that is then compared with the actual features of an object as detected by the senses. This comparison gives rise to a measure of category belongingness. As long as this difference between sensation and expectation does not exceed a set threshold called the 'vigilance parameter', the sensed object will be considered a member of the expected class. The system thus offers a solution to the 'plasticity/stability' problem, i.e. the problem of acquiring new knowledge without disrupting existing knowledge that is also called incremental learning.

Academic acknowledgements

Per Boston University, where Carpenter is a "Professor Emerita of Mathematics and Statistics," she is acknowledged has having been the very first woman to receive the Institute of Electrical and Electronics Engineers (IEEE) Neural Networks Pioneer Award in 2008. She was also elected to successive three-year terms on the Board of Governors of the International Neural Network Society (INNS)) since its founding in 1987, and received the INNS Gabor Award in 1999. She has also served as an elected member of the Council of the American Mathematical Society, and is a charter member of the Association for Women in Mathematics.

Her memberships include 
American Mathematical Society (AMS) 
Association for Women in Mathematics (AWM) 
Institute of Electrical and Electronics Engineers (IEEE) 
IEEE Computational Intelligence Society 
International Neural Network Society (INNS)

Additional awards and honors include
Institute of Electrical and Electronics Engineers 
IEEE Fellow Award (2013) 
 
IEEE Senior Membership Award (2011) 
IEEE Neural Networks Pioneer Award (2008)

	
International Neural Network Society 
INNS Fellow Award (2011) 
College of Fellows (2011 – ) 
Governing Board (1987–2010) 
Secretary & Executive Committee (1994–2000) 
Vice President (1988 1989)

American Mathematical Society 
AMS Council – Member at Large (1996–1999) 
Committee on the Profession (1996–1999) 
Liaison Committee with AAAS (2004–2006)

Editorial Boards
Brain Research
IEEE Transactions on Neural Networks
Neural Networks
Biologically Inspired Cognitive Architectures

Selected published articles
Carpenter, G. A. (2019). Looking to the future: Learning from experience, averting catastrophe. Neural Networks. 
Carpenter, G. A., & Grossberg, S. (1987). A massively parallel architecture for a self-organizing neural pattern recognition machine. Computer Vision, Graphics and Image Processing, 37(1), 54–115. https://doi.org/10.1016/S0734-189X(87)80014-2 
Carpenter, G. A., Grossberg, S., Markuzon, N., Reynolds, J. H., & Rosen, D. B. (1992). Fuzzy ARTMAP: A Neural Network Architecture for Incremental Supervised Learning of Analog Multidimensional Maps. IEEE Transactions on Neural Networks, 3(5), 698–713. https://doi.org/10.1109/72.159059 
Carpenter, G. A., Grossberg, S., & Reynolds, J. H. (1991). ARTMAP: Supervised real-time learning and classification of nonstationary data by a self-organizing neural network. Neural Networks, 4(5), 565–588. https://doi.org/10.1016/0893-6080(91)90012-T 
Carpenter, G. A., Grossberg, S., & Rosen, D. B. (1991). Fuzzy ART: Fast stable learning and categorization of analog patterns by an adaptive resonance system. Neural Networks, 4(6), 759–771. https://doi.org/10.1016/0893-6080(91)90056-B

References

Other sources

Carpenter is also cited in the following book:
’’American Men & Women of Science’’ A biographical directory of today's leaders in physical, biological and related sciences. 23rd edition. Eight volumes. Detroit: Thomson Gale, 2006. (AmMWSc 23)

External links 

The INNS (International Neural Network Society) history project has been documenting the experiences of pioneers of the INNS field:  You Tube video interview with Gail Carpenter, Recorded January 14, 2021.
 INNS History Project.
Boston University Staff web page for Professor Gail Carpenter.

1948 births
Living people
American cognitive scientists
Boston University faculty
20th-century American mathematicians
21st-century American mathematicians
University of Colorado alumni
University of Wisconsin–Madison College of Letters and Science alumni
Northeastern University faculty
International School of Geneva alumni
American women mathematicians